Sexy Beat is the fifth EP by the South Korean boy group MBLAQ. It includes the single "Smoky Girl". Love Beat, a repackaged studio album, was released two months later on August 12, 2013.

Track listing

Track listing for Sexy Beat

Track listing for the repackaged version Love Beat

Chart performance

Sexy Beat

Album chart

Single chart

Sales and certifications

Love Beat

Album chart

Sales and certifications

Release history

References

External links
 MBLAQ's Official Site

MBLAQ EPs
2013 EPs
Korean-language EPs
J. Tune Entertainment EPs